Kapuskasing Airport  is located  west of the town of Kapuskasing in northern Ontario, Canada. The airport formerly handled scheduled passenger service through Bearskin Airlines, which flew to Timmins but that service was discontinued at the end of June 2017. It is an airport of entry, providing customs services for general aviation flights arriving directly from the United States.

General Motors uses the airport's runways for cold-weather testing of ground vehicles. It is also used for emergency medical flights.

References

External links

Certified airports in Cochrane District
Kapuskasing